Karoline Bjerkeli Grøvdal (born 14 June 1990) is a Norwegian middle-, long-distance and steeplechase runner. She won bronze medals for the 10,000 metres at the 2016 European Championships, and in the 3000 m steeplechase at the 2018 European Championships. Grøvdal earned nine individual medals at the European Cross Country Championships, an unsurpassed record by a female athlete in the meet history.

In 2007, she won the bronze medal in the 2000 m steeplechase at the World Youth Championships and gold for the 3000 m steeplechase at the European Junior Championships. At the 2009 European Junior Championships, she won gold for two events: 5000 m and 3000 m steeplechase. Grøvdal represented Norway at the 2012 London, 2016 Rio and 2020 Tokyo Olympics as well as at nine World Athletics Championships. She holds four Norwegian records (One mile, indoor 3000 m, 5000 m, 3000 m steeplechase) plus two bests (2000 m, 2000 m steeplechase). She won 17 national titles.

Career
Karoline Grøvdal gained her first international experience as a 16-year-old in June 2006, winning 3000 m steeplechase race at the European Cup Second League held in Banská Bystrica, Slovakia. In August that year, she placed fifth in the event at the World Under-20 Championships, and in December, she capped her season with the silver medal for the U20 race at the European Cross Country Championships.

In June 2007, still 16, Grøvdal broke Norwegian senior records in the 3000 m steeplechase in Neerpelt, Belgium with a time of 9:33.19. The following month, she finished third in the 2000 m steeplechase at the World U18 Championships, and won the 3000 m steeplechase event at the European U20 Championships, breaking the European under-20 record.

In 2009, after she won three gold medals altogether at the European Junior and Cross Country Championships (U20 race), she was voted European Athletics Female Rising Star of the Year.

Injuries and illness characterized the start of Grøvdal's senior career. She started to achieve better results from 2015.

At senior level, she won the bronze medal at the 2015 European Cross Country Championships, bronze in 10,000 metres at the 2016 European Athletics Championships, bronze medals at 2016, 2017, 2018 European Cross Country Championships, bronze in the 3000 m steeplechase at the 2018 European Athletics Championships, silver at the 2019 European Cross Country Championships, and eventually a gold at the 2021 European Cross Country Championships. She defended her European cross country title in 2022.

Grøvdal competed at the 2012 London, 2016 Rio and 2020 Tokyo Summer Olympics.

During 2021 Grøvdal improved her personal record at several distances, including 1500, 3000, 5000 and 10,000 metres. Participating in a Diamond League event in Brussels in September, she set her personal record at the 5000 metres in a time of 14:43.26. She beat that mark on the Diamond circuit at the home Bislett Games in Oslo the following year, breaking Ingrid Kristiansen’s almost 36-year-old Norwegian record by six seconds with a time of 14:31.07.

International competitions

Personal bests
 1500 metres – 4:03.07 (Stockholm 2021)
 One mile – 4:26.23 (Oslo 2016) 
 2000 metres – 5:41.04 (Florø 2018) 
 3000 metres – 8:33.47 (Paris 2021)
 3000 metres indoor – 8:44.68 (Bærum 2019) 
5000 metres – 14:31.07 (Oslo 2022) 
 10,000 metres – 30:50.84 (Oslo 2021)
 2000 metres steeplechase – 6:21.39 (Stavanger 2008) 
 3000 metres steeplechase – 9:13.35 (Sandnes 2017) 
Road
 5 km – 15:00 (Zürich 2021)
 10 km – 30:32 (Hole 2020)
 Half marathon – 1:08:07 (New York, NY 2022)

References

External links

 
 

Norwegian female steeplechase runners
1990 births
Living people
Sportspeople from Ålesund
Athletes (track and field) at the 2012 Summer Olympics
Athletes (track and field) at the 2016 Summer Olympics
Olympic athletes of Norway
World Athletics Championships athletes for Norway
European Athletics Championships medalists
Norwegian female cross country runners
European Athletics Rising Star of the Year winners
Norwegian Athletics Championships winners
Athletes (track and field) at the 2020 Summer Olympics